"Just the Way" is a song recorded by American country music group Parmalee and American rapper Blanco Brown. It was released on December 13, 2019 as the first single from Parmalee's seventh studio album For You. The song was written by Parmalee's lead vocalist Matt Thomas, along with Kevin Bard and Nolan Sipe.

Background 
"Just the Way" is an upbeat song with a catchy melody that fits the content of the track, and praises folks for being true to themselves and encourages self-acceptance.

Music video
The music video was uploaded on February 26, 2020. The video shines a spotlight on different types of women, from a young girl who's in a wheelchair to an older woman full of life. The scene is set against a colorful backdrop as the guys hand each woman red, pink, and yellow roses, the camera capturing their delighted reactions as the bubbly pop-country song plays.

Live performance
On December 1, 2019, Parmalee and Brown debuted "Just the Way" during halftime of Sunday Night Football.

Charts
"Just the Way" debuted at number 59 on the Billboard Country Airplay chart dated May 30, 2020. In January 2021, it became Parmalee's first Top 10 country single since "Already Callin' You Mine" in 2015, and in March it became their second number one single, and their first since  "Carolina" in December 2013. In addition, it was Brown's first number one single on the Country Airplay chart.

Weekly charts

Year-end charts

Certifications

Release history

References

2019 singles
2019 songs
Parmalee songs
Songs written by Nolan Sipe
BBR Music Group singles
Blanco Brown songs
Vocal collaborations